The Sette-Daban is a range of mountains in far North-eastern Russia. Administratively the range belongs partly to the Sakha Republic and partly to the  Khabarovsk Krai of the Russian Federation. The area of the Sette-Daban is largely uninhabited. The R504 Kolyma Highway passes through the northern part of the range.

The climate prevailing in the Sette-Daban is continental and severe. The average air temperature in January is a chilly .

History
In 1829, German physicist Georg Adolf Erman during a round-the-world (1828-1830) journey reported the existence of "Seven Ranges" (Sette Daban) between 135° and 140° E in the area of one of the upper tributaries of the Yudoma.

The range was surveyed in 1934 by geologist Yuri Bilibin (1901—1952) together with mining engineer Evgeny Bobin (1897—1941) in the course of an expedition sent by the government of the Soviet Union. After conducting the first topographic survey of the area Bilibin established that this chain consists of three parallel ridges with pointed, often rocky peaks, and that it belongs to the Verkhoyansk Mountain System. Bilibin and Bobin also explored for the first time the Yudoma-Maya Highlands and the Skalisty Range, directly adjacent to Sette-Daban.

Geography
The Sette-Daban is a range located in southeastern Yakutia, at the southern end of the Verkhoyansk Range, part of the East Siberian System of mountains. It is bound in the north by the Tompo River and in the west by the Ulakhan-Bom, in the east by the Skalisty Range and to the south and east flows the Allakh-Yun River valley, beyond which rise the Dzhugdzhur Range and the Stanovoy Highlands, to the west by the Aldan River valley beyond which rises the Lena Plateau. To the northeast rises the Suntar-Khayata Range and to the east, the Yudoma-Maya Highlands. The highest point of the Sette-Daban is an unnamed peak reaching .

The area of the range is crossed from north to south by the Yudoma river valley. The Eastern Khandyga River, the Tyry and the Khanda have their sources in the range.

Flora and fauna
The slopes of the range are covered by larch forests, giving way to dwarf cedar thickets and mountain tundra at elevations above .

The lower altitudes of the Sette-Daban mountains provide a habitat for the Siberian Wood Frog and the Siberian Salamander.

See also
List of mountains and hills of Russia

References

External links
Moss flora of Sette-Daban Range (Yakutia)
Liverworts of the Sette-Daban Range (Eastern Yakutia)

Verkhoyansk Range
Mountain ranges of Khabarovsk Krai

sah:Сэттэ Дабаан, сис